Michał Paweł Gorstkin-Wywiórski (14 March 1861, Warsaw - 30 May 1926, Berlin) was a Polish painter; primarily of landscapes and maritime scenes. Because of this, he was also an amateur naturalist and maritime historian.

Biography

He was the son of a Russian army officer and his Polish wife. It was then that he began adding his mother's maiden name to Gorstkin. A sudden illness forced him to discontinue his studies and return home.

After a brief stay in Zurich for his health, he decided to study art instead. From 1883 to 1887, he studied at the Academy of Fine Arts Munich with Karl Raupp and Nikolaos Gyzis. He also took private lessons with Józef Brandt and Alfred Kowalski. In 1894, his painting of a Lithuanian forest earned him a second-class medal at the Glaspalast. After 1895, he lived in Berlin for several years before returning to Poland. While there, at the invitation of Wojciech Kossak and Julian Fałat, he participated in painting a panorama depicting the Battle of Berezina. This was followed by an invitation from Jan Styka to work on the Transylvania Panorama.

After that, he devoted himself to travel, visiting (among many other places) Spain (1899-1900), Egypt (1900-1901), Scandinavia (1903-1904) and the Carpathians (1906). In Spain, he and Kossak gathered material for a panorama of the Battle of Somosierra, which was never completed because of objections from the Russian authorities. In Egypt, he made sketches for a panorama of the Battle of the Pyramids.

At first, he painted genre scenes dealing primarily with Cossacks and Tatars. Later, under the influence of the Young Poland movement, he shifted his interest to landscapes and marine art. He was a member of several art societies and professional groups in Poznań, which was his primary home after 1904.

Selected paintings

References

Further reading 
 Ku morzu z biegiem rzek: Michał Gorstkin Wywiórski, (exhibition catalog, "Polish Artists of the Sea") Centralne Muzeum Morskie, Gdańsk, 2005  
 Article about the exhibition at the Museum's website.

External links

Arcadja Auctions: More works by Gorstkin-Wywiórski.
Biography and appreciation @ Polskie Muzy.

1861 births
1926 deaths
19th-century Polish painters
19th-century Polish male artists
20th-century Polish painters
20th-century Polish male artists
Polish landscape painters
Marine artists
Artists from Warsaw
Polish male painters